The American sole (Achirus mucuri) is a species of sole in the family Achiridae. It was described by Robson Tamar da Costa Ramos, Telton Pedro Anselmo Ramos and Paulo Roberto Duarte Lopes in 2009. It inhabits the Mucuri River in Brazil, from which its species epithet is derived.

References

Pleuronectiformes
Fish of the Mucuri River basin
Taxa named by Robson Tamar da Costa Ramos
Taxa named by Telton Pedro Anselmo Ramos
Taxa named by Paulo Roberto Duarte Lopes
Fish described in 2009